Mount Vernon is a city in Linn County, Iowa, United States, adjacent to the city of Lisbon. The population was 4,527 at the time of the 2020 census.  Mount Vernon is part of the Cedar Rapids Metropolitan Statistical Area.

History
Mount Vernon was laid out in 1847, but its origins date back to at least 1838, when it was known as Pinhook, a popular rest stop on Military Road, which ran between Dubuque, on the Mississippi River, and Iowa City. It was renamed Mount Vernon in 1847, after the estate of George Washington. A post office has been in operation in Mount Vernon since 1849. The Iowa Conference Male and Female Seminary (which later became Cornell College) was established in the town in 1853, and the Northwestern Railroad reached it in 1859, bringing new business to the town as its population expanded.

Geography
Mount Vernon is located at  (41.924096, -91.419679).

The most prominent geographic feature of Mount Vernon is the "mountain" on which it sits. This "mountain" is actually a paha, a ridge formed of sand and loess along the line of the prevailing wind during the ice ages. The Mount Vernon paha is roughly one mile (2 km) long and 1/4 mile (1/2 km) wide, aligned along a roughly northwest to southeast axis and standing up to 100 feet (30 m) above the surrounding landscape. Uptown Mount Vernon is aligned with the southeast end of the ridge crest, while the campus of Cornell College crowns the northwest end of the ridge.

Transportation
The town is located on significant transportation corridors, both current and historical. The main line of the Union Pacific Railroad passes through the city, and the town is located on the historic Lincoln Highway. U.S. Route 30 and Iowa Highway 1 intersect in the southern part of town. Passenger train service was once provided by the Chicago and North Western Railway from a station in the north of town. The CRANDIC interurban electric railway ran from Cedar Rapids, through downtown Mount Vernon, and ended in nearby Lisbon. The interurban ran from 1914 to 1928 and took 45 minutes to travel to the western terminus of Cedar Rapids. Nearby stops included Bertram, the Palisades and Cornell College.

Demographics

2010 census
At the 2010 census there were 4,506 people in 1,353 households, including 894 families, in the city. The racial makup of the city was 95.0% White, 0.9% African American, 0.2% Native American, 1.7% Asian, 0.5% from other races, and 1.6% from two or more races. Hispanic or Latino of any race were 1.9%.

Of the 1,353 households 37.3% had children under the age of 18 living with them, 54.2% were married couples living together, 9.2% had a female householder with no husband present, 2.7% had a male householder with no wife present, and 33.9% were non-families. 26.5% of households were one person and 8.9% were one person aged 65 or older. The average household size was 2.54 and the average family size was 3.14.

The median age was 24.4 years. 22.9% of residents were under the age of 18; 27.7% were between the ages of 18 and 24; 19.7% were from 25 to 44; 20.1% were from 45 to 64; and 9.5% were 65 or older. The gender makeup of the city was 48.5% male and 51.5% female.

2000 census
The city's population was 3,390 when the 2000 census figures were released, but that number was later revised to 3,808 because the Census Bureau had incorrectly reported that 418 residents of a Cornell College dormitory in Mount Vernon lived in the nearby city of Bertram.

At the 2000 census there were 3,390 people in 1,129 households, including 795 families, in the city. The racial makup of the city was 97.05% White, 0.65% African American, 0.24% Native American, 0.71% Asian, 0.03% Pacific Islander, 0.41% from other races, and 0.91% from two or more races. Hispanic or Latino of any race were 0.94%.

Of the 1,129 households 37.6% had children under the age of 18 living with them, 57.8% were married couples living together, 9.3% had a female householder with no husband present, and 29.5% were non-families. 23.3% of households were one person and 7.7% were one person aged 65 or older. The average household size was 2.58 and the average family size was 3.09.

The age spread: 25.6% under the age of 18, 20.5% from 18 to 24, 23.2% from 25 to 44, 21.5% from 45 to 64, and 9.2% 65 or older. The median age was 30 years. For every 100 females, there were 87.9 males. For every 100 females age 18 and over, there were 80.9 males.

The median household income was $51,228 and the median family income  was $59,205. Males had a median income of $39,402 versus $27,358 for females. The per capita income for the city was $19,027. About 4.1% of families and 5.5% of the population were below the poverty line, including 4.2% of those under age 18 and 3.3% of those age 65 or over.

Arts and culture
Located on Highway 30, is a local artist, Mark Benesh's rendition of Grant Wood's American Gothic, on the side of a barn.

Annual events 
A sidewalk chalk festival, Chalk the Walk, has taken place in Mount Vernon each May starting in 2006. The event attracts over 300 artists and requires more than a half-ton of chalk. Artists can register to color an 8' x 10' section of pavement with their own design. Although participation is free, cash prizes awarded for these large drawings. Each year there is also one large collaborative piece of art that is 20' by 40'. Interested participants recreate a single 2' by 2' square of the image, and the result is a giant image colored with pastel chalk by dozens of artists of all ages and abilities. Chalk the Walk is Iowa's largest annual Madonnari Festival.

Magical Night, a downtown Christmas festival, takes place in December.

Other events include the Chocolate Stroll, Heritage Days, Chili Cook-Off, and Uptown Thursday Nights.

Popular culture
In the October 2009 edition of Budget Travel Magazine in an article entitled America's Coolest Small Towns, Mount Vernon was included as one of the ten selected. A quote from the magazine. "Every now and then, you stumble upon a town that's gotten everything right—great coffee, food with character, shop owners with purpose."

Education
Mount Vernon is the home of Cornell College, a liberal arts institution with an enrollment of approximately 1,200 students. Cornell's entire campus is on the National Register of Historic Places.

Mount Vernon has an elementary school, middle school, and high school all situated on the Mount Vernon Community School District campus. The newest building of the three, Mount Vernon's high school, was built in 2006. Previously, the high school was situated at the current middle school. The middle school at the time, however, instead was located uptown for what is now the First Street Community Center. 
 
In the United States general elections, 2006, Cornell political science professor David Loebsack was elected to the U.S. House of Representatives in an upset victory over 15-term incumbent Jim Leach.

Notable people
Leo Beranek (1914-2016), MIT professor, scientist & businessman, attended college in Mount Vernon
Dan Bern (b. 1959), folk musician
Matt Kroul (b. 1986), National Football League player
Tristan Wirfs (b. 1999), National Football League player
Peter Kollman (1944-2001), chemist and professor

References

External links

 City of Mount Vernon
 Mount Venon Schools
Early History of Mount Vernon
City-Data Comprehensive Statistical Data and more about Mount Vernon

 
Cities in Iowa
Cities in Linn County, Iowa
Cedar Rapids, Iowa metropolitan area
1847 establishments in Iowa